Knotting and Souldrop is a civil parish in the Borough of Bedford in the county of Bedfordshire, England.

The two parishes of Knotting and Souldrop were combined in 1934. Until 1974 the parish formed part of Bedford Rural District.

References

Civil parishes in Bedfordshire
Borough of Bedford